Mahabir Club is a Nepalese professional football club from Kathmandu. They play at 25,000 capacity Dasarath Rangasala Stadium. The club is a three-time Martyr's Memorial A-Division League champion, having won the title of the premier season in 1955.

League finishes 
The season-by-season performance of Mahabir Club since 2004:

Honours

National 

 Martyr's Memorial A-Division League:
 Champions:  1954–55, 1966–67, 1969–70

References 

Football clubs in Nepal